Espingueira was an abandoned village near the northern coast of the island of Boa Vista. The village is around 4 km northeast of the village Bofarreira and 13 km east of the island capital of Sal Rei. 

The village has been refurbished and is now an eco-lodge, where electricity is provided by a photovoltaic power plant (10 kW).

See also
List of villages and settlements in Cape Verde

References

Villages and settlements in Boa Vista, Cape Verde